During the 2007–08 English football season, Scunthorpe United F.C. competed in the Football League Championship and in the second tier of English football for the first time since 1964, following promotion from League One the previous season.

Season summary
Before the start of the 2007–08 season, Billy Sharp was sold to Sheffield United for a then-club record £2,000,000. Despite his ostensible replacement, Martin Paterson, scoring 13 league goals, Scunthorpe were unable to cement their place in the second tier of English football, and were relegated in 23rd place. Paterson was then sold to Burnley at the end of the season for a £1,600,000.

Final league table

Results
Scunthorpe United's score comes first

Legend

Football League Championship

FA Cup

League Cup

Squad

Left club during season

Team kit
 Manufacturer: Carlotti
 Principal Sponsor: Rainham Steel
 Secondary Sponsor: Smiths Fashion

References

Scunthorpe United F.C. seasons
Scunthorpe United